Midvaal Local Municipality is an administrative area within the Sedibeng District Municipality of Gauteng in South Africa. The municipality's name references its geographical location halfway between the Johannesburg and East Rand areas and the Vaal and Vereeniging areas.

Midvaal Local Municipality   the fastest growing municipality in Gauteng due to its rapid economic growth. Midvaal has undergone a radical change from quaint country area to booming tourist, recreational and industrial centre in Southern Gauteng. Midvaal has grown from 60 000 residents in 2001 to 100 000 today.  A report by Gauteng’s Provincial Government ranked Midvaal as the province's top municipality in terms of quality of life. In December 2010 Midvaal was ranked 23rd out of 231 municipalities. 

The Oprah Winfrey School was established in the area. In addition golfer Greg Norman invested into the Eye of Africa Golfing Estate development for which he designed the golf course. The municipality’s major achievement has been attracting Sedibeng Breweries, South Africa’s distributors of Heineken into the area. The brewery has set up its national offices along Midvaal R59 freeway/ corridor and has brought with it new opportunities for job creation and small businesses.

Politics 

The municipal council consists of thirty members elected by mixed-member proportional representation. Fifteen councillors are elected by first-past-the-post voting in fifteen wards, while the remaining fifteen are chosen from party lists so that the total number of party representatives is proportional to the number of votes received. In the election of 1 November 2021 the Democratic Alliance (DA) won a majority of nineteen seats on the council.

The following table shows the results of the election.

Demographics

Main places

The 2001 census divided the municipality into the following main places:

References

External links

Local municipalities of the Sedibeng District Municipality